Ethan Tobman (born May 30, 1979) is a Canadian film production designer and director.

Tobman is from Montreal. He directed the short film Remote, which screened at the 2001 Cannes Film Festival. The Hollywood Reporter positively reviewed Tobman's production design for the 2014 film That Awkward Moment.

He served as production designer for the 2015 Canadian-Irish film Room, for which he and Mary Kirkland won the Canadian Screen Award for Best Achievement in Art Direction/Production Design. In designing the eponymous Room set at Pinewood Toronto Studios,  he set out with the idea "that every square inch of Room needed to have a backstory." Tobman also proposed an "inverted Rubik's Cube" for a set, with removable parts. Tobman subsequently worked on Felix van Groeningen's 2018 Beautiful Boy. Using the house from the TV series Big Little Lies for a set, he made numerous alterations including to the counters.

Tobman has also served as a production designer for music videos, including "Formation" and "Lemonade" by Beyoncé.  In 2014, for the music video "The Writing's on the Wall" by the U.S. band OK Go, he was tasked with helping create a number of perspective illusions.

Filmography

Films

Visual albums
 Beyoncé: Lemonade by Beyoncé (2016)
Black Is King by Beyoncé (2020)

Music videos

References

External links

1979 births
Living people
Artists from Montreal
Canadian production designers
Best Art Direction/Production Design Genie and Canadian Screen Award winners